Lai Yiu Estate is a public housing estate in Lai King, Kwai Chung, New Territories, Hong Kong. It is located near Central Kwai Chung Park and Castle Peak Road (Kwai Chung Section). It is located at the north mid-level of Lai King Estate and it consists of five residential buildings completed in 1976, 1977 and 1999 respectively.

Tsui Yiu Court is a Home Ownership Scheme housing court in Lai King. It is located near Lai Yiu Estate, Lai King Fire Station and Castle Peak Road (Kwai Chung Section). It has a single residential block completed in 1981.

Houses

Lai Yiu Estate

Tsui Yiu Court

Demographics
In 1990, the Gross Estate Area of Lai Yiu Estate was 6.1 ha. The authorized population was 13,258 and the theoretical density was 2,173 persons/ha. The actual density was 1,437 persons/ha. As of September 2021, the authorised population  of Lai Yiu Estate was 8,000.

According to the 2016 by-census, Lai Yiu Estate had a population of 8,254. The median age was 46.8 and the majority of residents (94.2 per cent) were of Chinese ethnicity. The average household size was 3 people. The median monthly household income of all households (i.e. including both economically active and inactive households) was HK$24,950.

Politics
Lai Yiu Estate and Tsui Yiu Court are located in Wah Lai constituency of the Kwai Tsing District Council. It was formerly represented by Sin Chung-kai, who was elected in the 2019 elections until May 2021.

See also

Public housing estates in Kwai Chung

References

Residential buildings completed in 1976
Residential buildings completed in 1977
Residential buildings completed in 1999
Lai King
Public housing estates in Hong Kong